The Journal of Diplomacy and International Relations is an annual academic journal published by the School of Diplomacy and International Relations at Seton Hall University covering international affairs. It was established in 2000 as the Seton Hall Journal of Diplomacy and International Relations and is managed and edited by graduate students at the School of Diplomacy and International Relations. The current editor-in-chief is Peter Roberto.

Abstracting and indexing 
The journal is abstracted and indexed in:
 Columbia International Affairs Online
 Public Affairs Information Service
 International Political Science Abstracts
 America: History and Life
 Historical Abstracts
 International Relations and Security Network

International relations journals
Biannual journals
English-language journals
Publications established in 2000
Academic journals published by university presses
Seton Hall University